Tanjung Agas is a small town in Tangkak District, Johor, Malaysia. It is located on the north bank of the Muar River and on the intersection between the roads to Malacca and Tangkak. It also located 1 km from Muar town.

References
Entry at Geographic.org, publishing data from the National Geospatial-Intelligence Agency

Towns, suburbs and villages in Tangkak